Andrew Barron (2 July 1881 – 2 August 1915) was a New Zealand cricketer. He played in one first-class match for Canterbury in 1904/05, and one first-class match for Wellington in 1905/06.

References

External links
 

1881 births
1915 deaths
New Zealand cricketers
Canterbury cricketers
Wellington cricketers
Cricketers from Christchurch